The year 1836 in architecture involved some significant events.

Buildings and structures

Buildings

 January – Charles Barry wins the competition for the design of a new Palace of Westminster in London in Gothic Revival style.
 January 26 – Lansdowne Bridge in Lansdowne, New South Wales, Australia, designed by David Lennox, is opened.
 May 5 – St Ignatius Church, Preston, Lancashire, England, designed by Joseph John Scoles, is opened.
 July 29 – The Arc de Triomphe in Paris, completed by Jean Chalgrin following the death of Louis-Étienne Héricart de Thury, is inaugurated.
 October 4 – Rebuilt Christiania Theatre opens in Norway.
 Fleetwood Customs House in England, designed by Decimus Burton, is completed.
 Mexican Hothouse in the Jardin des Plantes, Paris, by Charles Rohault de Fleury, is completed; an early example of French glass and metal architecture.
 Glynnwood Plantation is built in Glynn, near Pointe Coupee, Louisiana.
 Inverness Castle, Scotland, designed by William Burn, is built.

Publications
 August 4 – A. W. N. Pugin publishes his Contrasts, a treatise on the morality of Catholic Gothic architecture.

Awards
 Grand Prix de Rome, architecture: François-Louis-Florimond Boulanger and Jean-Jacques Clerget.

Births
 March 2 – E. R. Robson, English architect specialising in schools (died 1917)
 March 20 – James Cubitt, English architect specialising in nonconformist chapels (died 1912)

Deaths
 June 7 – Henry A. Baker, Irish architect (born 1753)

References

Architecture
Years in architecture
19th-century architecture